Natalie Nicole Hemby Wrucke (born March 24, 1977) is an American country music songwriter and singer. She has written songs for Lee Ann Womack, Eli Young Band, Toby Keith, Miranda Lambert, Sunny Sweeney, Little Big Town, Jon Pardi, Kacey Musgraves, and Lady Gaga. In 2019, she joined the quartet The Highwomen alongside Brandi Carlile, Amanda Shires and Maren Morris.

Early life 
Hemby was born in Bloomington, Illinois.
She is the daughter of Nashville studio guitarist Tom Hemby and Deanna Hemby.

Career

Songwriting 
Hemby has accumulated eight No. 1 Billboard singles during her career. Hemby's cuts include "White Liar" and "Only Prettier" by Miranda Lambert, "Pontoon" and "Tornado" by Little Big Town, "Drinks After Work" by Toby Keith and "Automatic" by Miranda Lambert. She is currently a writer at Universal Music Group Nashville (UMPG), and has formerly been affiliated with EMI Publishing and Carnival Music.

Solo albums 
On January 13, 2017, Hemby released her first studio album, Puxico, named after the Missouri town where her grandfather lived, via the label GetWrucke Productions which she runs with her husband, music producer Mike Wrucke.

In February 2021, Hemby signed with Fantasy Records. Produced by Mike Wrucke, her first album on Fantasy, Pins and Needles, was released on October 8, 2021.

The Highwomen 
Hemby was revealed as the final member of The Highwomen, a country music group that already featured Brandi Carlile, Maren Morris and Amanda Shires, on April 1, 2019, when the group performed live for the first time at the Bridgestone Arena as part of an 87th birthday tribute concert for Loretta Lynn. "Redesigning Women" was released on July 19, 2019, as the first single from their self-titled debut album set for release on September 6, 2019.

Personal life 
Hemby is married to record producer Mike Wrucke.

Discography

Studio albums

Solo albums 
 Puxico (2017)
 Pins and Needles (2021)

With The Highwomen 
 The Highwomen (2019)

Songwriting

Awards and nominations

References 

American women country singers
American country singer-songwriters
Living people
People from Nashville, Tennessee
Grammy Award winners
1977 births
Singer-songwriters from Tennessee
People from Stoddard County, Missouri
21st-century American singers
21st-century American women singers
Country musicians from Tennessee
Country musicians from Missouri
Country musicians from Illinois
The Highwomen members
Singer-songwriters from Illinois
Singer-songwriters from Missouri